The 2009 MOBO Awards took place on 30 September 2009 at the Scottish Exhibition and Conference Centre (SECC) in Glasgow, Scotland.

This was the first time the awards took place outside London. A tribute performance was dedicated to Michael Jackson, who was honoured with the MOBO Lifetime Achievement Award, and the Young Soul Rebels performed their charity single, "I Got Soul". Reggie Yates and Keri Hilson hosted the awards. Other guests included Rihanna who opened the show and Amir Khan who presented an award. The show was watched by an estimated 250million viewers worldwide.

List of nominations and winners
(winners in bold)

Best UK Act
 Alesha Dixon
 Bashy
 Beverley Knight
 Dizzee Rascal
 DJ Ironik
 Donae'o
 Mr Hudson
 N-Dubz
 Tinchy Stryder

Best Newcomer
 Alexandra Burke
 Jade Ewen
 JLS
 Laura Izibor
 Master Shortie
 N-Dubz

Best R&B/Soul Act
 Beverley Knight
 Ciara
 Jeremih
 Keri Hilson
 Lemar

Best Hip-Hop Act
 Chipmunk
 Dizzee Rascal
 Drake
 Eminem
 Kanye West

Best Music Video
 Dizzee Rascal - "Bonkers"
 Alesha Dixon - "The Boy Does Nothing"
 Chipmunk - "Diamond Rings" (featuring Emeli Sandé)
 Beyoncé - "Single Ladies (Put a Ring on It)"
 Mr. Hudson - "Supernova" (featuring Kanye West)

Best International Act
 Akon
 Beyoncé
 Ciara
 Mariah Carey
 Eminem
 Jay-Z
 Kanye West
 Keri Hilson
 Lady Gaga
 Drake

Best Song
 JLS - "Beat Again"
 Chipmunk - "Diamond Rings" (featuring Emeli Sandé)
 K.I.G. Family - "Head, Shoulders, Knees and Toes"
 Tinchy Stryder - "Number 1" (featuring N-Dubz)
 N-Dubz - "Strong Again"

Best Album
 Kanye West - 808s & Heartbreak
 Tinchy Stryder - Catch 22
 Bashy - Catch Me If You Can
 Beyoncé - I Am... Sasha Fierce
 N-Dubz - Uncle B

Best Reggae
 Mavado
 Sean Paul
 Serani
 Tarrus Riley
 Vybz Kartel
 Alamin Rahman

Best DJ
 Manny Norte
 Masterstepz
 Mistajam
 Ras Kwame
 Rickie & Melvin
 Sarah Love
 Semtex
 Shortee Blitz
 Steve Sutherland
 DJ Target
 Tim Westwood
 Trevor Nelson

Best Jazz Act
 Diana Krall
 Herbie Hancock
 Madeleine Peyroux
 Melody Gardot
 Yolanda Brown

Best African Act
 Amadou and Mariam
 Baaba Maal
 Eldee
 Femi Kuti
 K'Naan
 Lira
 Mujava
 Nneka
 Oumou Sangare
 Salif Keita

Best Gospel Act
 Desire to Worship God
 Kiki Sheard
 Mary Mary
 New Direction
 Victizzle

Lifetime achievement award
Michael Jackson

See also
Music of Black Origin Awards

References

British music awards
2009 awards in the United Kingdom